"I Just Gotta Have You (Lover Turn Me On)" is a song by Kashif. It was released in 1982 as the first single from his 1983 self-titled debut album.

The song is Kashif's first top 5 hit on the Billboard R&B chart.

Chart performance

References

1983 singles
1983 songs
Arista Records singles